Mortó Sitarama Naique Pratap Rau Sar Dessai, born 4 January 1922) was an Indian-Portuguese medical analyst of Goan origin who worked in Goa and Portugal. He was born in Goa.

Biography 
Dessai completed his pharmacy and medicine courses at the Medical School of Goa (Escola Médica de Goa), respectively, in 1942 and 1948, and received four honorary awards in pharmacy and eight prizes, five honorifics and three institutional awards in medicine. He was an assistant of the third group of the Goa Medical School and in charge of the Hematology and Hemotherapy Services of Goa.

Training
Dessai also trained at the K.E.M. Hospital of Bombay and Blood Transfusion Services of the Civil Hospitals of Lisbon, from 1953 to 1955.

Dessai also graduated in 1955 at the Faculty of Medicine of the University of Porto.

Internships in Zurich and Basel
Dessai also did internships at laboratories in Zurich and Basel.

Dessai was, in 1959, the Biochemist Analyst of the Blood Service of the Civil Hospitals of Lisbon.

Papers published
He published the following papers: 
 Filaríase em Goa, 1952  
 Amibíase em Goa, 1954, em colecção  
 Grupos Sanguíneos dos Goeses, 1954, em colecção  
 Hemostase (alguns aspectos da sua Fisiopatologia), 1955, e  
 Anemias Hemolíticas, 1957, em colecção

References

1922 births
Possibly living people
University of Porto alumni
Portuguese writers
Portuguese biochemists
Portuguese people of Goan descent
Indian expatriate academics
Medical doctors from Goa